Hyblaea euryzona is a moth in the family Hyblaeidae described by Prout in 1921.

References

Hyblaeidae